Brotherly Love is an American sitcom television series that ran from September 16, 1995, to April 1, 1996, on NBC, and then moved to The WB, where it aired from September 15, 1996, until May 18, 1997. The series was created by Jonathan Schmock and Jim Vallely, and produced by Witt/Thomas Productions in association with Touchstone Television (season 1) and Walt Disney Television (season 2). The primary focus of the series is on the relationship of three brothers, played by real-life brothers Joey Lawrence, Matthew Lawrence, and Andrew Lawrence.

Characters

Main
 Joseph "Joe" Roman (played by Joey Lawrence) — He is the oldest of the three brothers. He is a half-brother to Matt and Andy. Claire is his stepmother. He is vain, cocky and arrogant at times, and thinks highly of himself, though he is a good person at heart. He is constantly fighting for the affection of Lou Davis. His brothers really look up to him as a role model and as a father-figure. He was born on November 10, 1975, as revealed in the episode "Once Around The Block" making him 20 years old at the start of the series. Joe was 5 when his father left him and his mother. His father eventually remarried to Claire. Together they had Matt and Andy. Joe's father later died in a racing accident. Joe's mother lives in California. Joe is an avid motorcycle fan and works as a mechanic.
 Matthew "Matt" Roman (played by Matthew Lawrence) — He is 15–16 and is the middle child. He bows to peer pressure easily. He is also put down by his family with some of his doings as well. Matt was an absolute neat freak and germaphobe; at the age of one, he could change his own diaper, and he went through his entire childhood without ever catching the chickenpox. He loved washing the dishes and was known for other odd habits like making "Matt water", folding his socks. Unlike Joe and Andy, he never did well with girls. He has a crush on Kristin and is said in the episode, "I scream, You scream", that Matt is in love with Kristen. He sang twice, once in an angel costume singing the last two bars of "Silent Night" (A Roman Holiday), the other (Art Attack) when he played his mother's guitar and sang a song called "Pigeon On Your Car" which was written by Matt Lawrence himself.
 Andrew "Andy" Roman (played by Andrew Lawrence) — He is the youngest. He is seen wearing a variety of costumes (including Wolverine and Spider-Man). He is a bundle of mischief and has a vivid imagination. In one of the episodes, he is "in love" with Lou Davis, and writes her an email. Andy was only 5 when his father died in a racing accident.
 Louise "Lou" Davis (played by Liz Vassey) — She is a female mechanic who is seen going out with different men in a few episodes. She is an artist, even having crafted a ring for one of her suitors. She is always making sarcastic remarks to Joe from what he says about her. In later episodes it is shown that she may have love interests in Joe Roman. Joe and Lou kiss under the mistletoe in an episode called, "A Roman Holiday" and in an episode, "Other people". Andy is said to be in love with her, and receives an email from him, signed, A Roman who loves you. She automatically believes it was Joe.
 Claire Roman (played by Melinda Culea) — She is Joe's stepmother, and Matt and Andy's mother. She is a take charge kind of woman and sometimes thinks Joe is a bad influence on Matt and Andy.
 Lloyd Burwell (played by Micheal McShane) — A former Coast Guardsman for six years and mechanic. He is overweight and is sometimes needy, but under his gruff exterior lies a sensitive, intelligent man. He used to go by the alias "The Masked Avenger", an alias he used to play pranks on Mr. Hangarter, a cruel drivers' education teacher. Lloyd is known to be somewhat stupid and ignorant, but in some episodes has surprised everyone and shown to be very intelligent.

Supporting
 Kristin (played by Rebecca Herbst) — She used to attend house parties often, but now has cleaned up her act. She is one of Matt's best friends. She used to have a crush on Joe. Matt has a crush on her, but she sees him more of a brother than a boyfriend. She was a bad girl and would get drunk, but changed after she and Matt started hanging out.
 Silent Jim (played by Karl David-Djerf) — He rarely speaks but when he does, Matt describes it as "something special". Instead of speaking he usually communicates with a laugh. He is a recurring cast member, although, he does not appear in many episodes.
 Myrna Burwell (played by Estelle Getty, seen only in season two's "Motherly Love") — She is Lloyd's mother who lives in a trailer, and is part of the reason why Lloyd is so needy. She can do cartwheels despite her age. She also teaches the mambo and is said to clip Lloyd's toenails.

Episodes

Series overview

Season 1 (1995–96)

Season 2 (1996–97)

Broadcast
The show was first aired on NBC as part of its 1995–96 schedule and then switched to The WB for the beginning of its 1996–97 lineup. The show also aired in syndication on Disney Channel from 1998 until 2002. It has also previously aired on Family Channel in Canada.

Awards and nominations

References

External links
 Official Website
 
 

1995 American television series debuts
1997 American television series endings
1990s American sitcoms
English-language television shows
NBC original programming
Disney Channel original programming
Television series by ABC Studios
American television series revived after cancellation
Television series about brothers
Television shows set in Philadelphia
Television series by Disney